Chandrapratap Singh (born 22 January 1957) is an Indian politician from the Bharatiya Janata Party (BJP) political party. 
He was a member of the 14th Lok Sabha of India, representing the Sidhi constituency of Madhya Pradesh.

Expulsion

In the sting Operation Duryodhana by the Noida based media firm Cobrapost, aired 12 December 2005 on the Indian Hindi news TV Channel Aaj Tak, Singh was caught on video accepting bribes of Rs. 35,000 for fielding fictitious questions in parliament.

On 23 December 2005, a Special Committee of the Lok Sabha found him guilty of contempt of the House and following a motion calling for the expulsion of all 11 MPs caught in the sting,  he was expelled from Parliament.

References

Living people
1957 births
Bharatiya Janata Party politicians from Madhya Pradesh
India MPs 2004–2009
People from Sidhi
People from Koriya district
India MPs 1999–2004
Lok Sabha members from Madhya Pradesh